In histology, a lacuna is a small space, containing an osteocyte in bone, or chondrocyte in cartilage.

Bone
The lacunae are situated between the lamellae, and consist of a number of oblong spaces. In an ordinary microscopic section, viewed by transmitted light, they appear as fusiform opaque spots. Each lacuna is occupied during life by a branched cell, termed an osteocyte, bone-cell or bone-corpuscle. Lacunae are connected to one another by small canals called canaliculi. A lacuna never contains more than one osteocyte. Sinuses are an example of lacuna.

Cartilage
The cartilage cells or chondrocytes are contained in cavities in the matrix, called cartilage lacunae; around these, the matrix is arranged in concentric lines as if it had been formed in successive portions around the cartilage cells. This constitutes the so-called capsule of the space. Each lacuna is generally occupied by a single cell, but during the division of the cells, it may contain two, four, or eight cells. Lacunae are found between narrow sheets of calcified matrix that are known as lamellae.

See also
 Lacunar stroke

References

External links
 
 Bone histology photomicrographs

Musculoskeletal system